The Boone News-Republican is a newspaper in Boone, Iowa, United States. It was established in 1907 as a result of a merger between the Boone Daily News and the Weekly Republican. 
It is owned by Gannett. Former owner Stephens Media sold its newspapers to GateHouse Media in 2015.

References

External links
Official website

Newspapers published in Iowa
Publications established in 1907
Mass media in Boone, Iowa
Gannett publications